The 2015 Rugby Europe Women’s U18 Sevens Championship was the second edition of the championship. The tournament was held in Liège, Belgium in September. England were crowned Champions.

Pool stages

Pool A 

 England 48-0 Ukraine
 Portugal 0-12 Germany
 England 39-0 Germany
 Portugal 31-5 Ukraine
 Germany 22- 5 Ukraine
 England 17-5 Portugal

Pool B 

 Wales 12-12 Spain
 Ireland 21-12 Italy
 Wales 22-5 Italy
 Ireland 14-22 Spain
 Italy 0-32 Spain
 Wales 10-7 Ireland

Pool C 

 Netherlands 12-10 Belgium
 Russia 17-5 Sweden
 Netherlands 14-5 Sweden
 Russia 5-7 Belgium
 Sweden 7-0 Belgium
 Netherlands 24-0 Russia

Knockout stages 
Cup Quarter-Finals

Plate Semi-Finals

Bowl Semi-Finals

References 

Under 18